St Patrick's College, sometimes referred to as St Pat's, Paddy's or SPC, is an independent Catholic secondary day and boarding school for boys, located in central Ballarat, Victoria, Australia. The school was founded by the Congregation of Christian Brothers in 1893, who continue to run the school through Edmund Rice Education Australia. The school provides education for boys from Year 7 to Year 12, with an emphasis on academic and sporting programs.

The college promotes the teachings of Jesus Christ and the Catholic Church, basing itself on the four pillars of faith, excellence, tradition and joy. The patron of the college, Paul Bird, Bishop of Ballarat, presides over the major college Masses along with other priests (including former students of St Patrick's).

History 
The college was originally called Holy Ghost College, which was started in 1888 and administered by the Holy Ghost Fathers. Also in 1888, St Alipius' Primary School was established by the Christian Brothers. However, after a promising start, the senior school closed due to the Holy Ghost Fathers' departure for France. The Bishop of Ballarat at the time, James Moore, contacted the Provincial of the Christian Brothers in Australia, Brother Patrick Ambrose Treacy, to take over the running of the school. The new college opened its doors on 24 January 1893, as St Patrick's College. Four Christian Brothers were on the initial staff, with the Brother J. L. Ryan as the founding headmaster.

In 1924 St Patrick's Christian Brother's boys' primary school was built in Drummond Street South. This school and St Alipius were operated by the Christian Brothers at St Patrick's College but both became systemic parish schools in the 1980s. St Patrick's College now no longer has a junior school attached to it and students commence at Year 7 having completed their primary education elsewhere.

The school gradually grew in stature and size to become not only the largest Catholic school in Ballarat, but one of the leading Catholic schools in Victoria. The college, under the governance of the Christian Brothers, grew from its first enrolment of 36 students in 1893 to 168 in 1902. The school's academic record was first class even in its infancy, with the 1893 dux of the college, Sir Hugh Devine, becoming a world-famous surgeon. The school has grown immensely in the past 100 years, with over 1,000 boys enrolled.

The college, in 1933, completed the construction of the Brother's residence, a large imposing red-brick building, still dominating the facade of the school. A memorial chapel was constructed in 1954 and dedicated to the memory of St Patrick's Old Collegians who died during the First and Second World Wars. This large Romanesque chapel still holds pride of place at the front of the school and is the centre of the school's spirituality. The college has over 300 graduates who have been ordained priests, a record in Australia. Over 60 graduates have entered into religious life.

In 1966, the W.T. O'Malley Wing was completed in dedication to Brother William Theodore O'Malley, who was not only deputy headmaster of the college for 30 years, but taught there for over 40 years. He is remembered as one of the greatest brothers to grace St Patrick's College, with many Old Collegians dedicating their successes to his tuition. In 1976 the J.L. Kelty Resource Centre was opened. It is dedicated to Brother Justin Linus Kelty, a former headmaster, who led the college in the 1960s.

In 1979, the college completed the W.T. O'Malley Sports Centre, which was officially opened by former students and Brownlow Medal winners John James and Brian Gleeson.

In 2004, the college officially opened the W.J. Wilding Wing, which now houses the senior school. The building was named in honour of Brother William Wilding, a former headmaster of the college in the early 1980s who oversaw the completion of the Dr Spring Administration Wing.

Peter Casey succeeded L. B. Collins in 2002 in 2002, becoming the school's first lay headmaster. John S. Crowley became St. Patrick's second lay headmaster in 2015.

Student abuse scandals 
Between 1953 and 1983 a number of students who attended St Patrick's College made allegations that they were sexually assaulted. Some of these cases were litigated and the offenders found guilty. A Christian Brother who lived at St Patrick's College in the early 1970s was subsequently convicted of child sexual offences related to activities at a branch school.

In May 2015 the Royal Commission into Institutional Responses to Child Sexual Abuse, a royal commission of inquiry initiated in 2013 by the Australian government and supported by all of its state governments, began an investigation into the response of Australian institutions, including the Catholic Church, to the impact of child sexual abuse on survivors, their families and their communities. 

The royal commission's final report about Catholic Church authorities in Ballarat was released on 6 December. The commission found that:

"Many children, mainly boys, said they were sexually abused at St Alipius and/or St Patrick’s College." Most allegations at St Patrick's College related to Ted Dowlan who taught there from 1973 to 1975.

Headmasters 
The following individuals have served as headmasters of St Patrick's College:

House system 
The college has four houses, named in honour of former headmasters of the college. They are:

Sport 
St Patrick's is a member of the Ballarat Associated Schools (BAS). The College was a founding member of the Associated Catholic Colleges in 1911 until 1975 and re-joined in 2022.

Notable alumni 

Arts, media, and entertainment
 Paul Bongiorno – chief political reporter with the Ten Network

 Raimond Gaita – author and Professor of Moral Philosophy at King's College London
 Bernard Heinze – professor of music and director of the New South Wales State Conservatorium of Music and 1974 Australian of the Year
 George Helon – Australian author and businessman who received the Freedom of the City of London in 2016
 David Parer - natural history film maker

Business
 Paul McGinness  – World War I fighter pilot, noted aviator, and founder of Qantas

Law, public service, and politics
 Steve Bracks – former Premier of Victoria
 Donald Morrison Grant  – former Surveyor-General of New South Wales
 Jim McClelland – solicitor, judge, senator, minister in the third Whitlam ministry and royal commissioner
 Gavan O'Connor – former Federal Shadow Minister
 Albert Ogilvie  – former Premier of Tasmania
 Harrie Seward – former senator and West Australian minister

Religion
 Frank Little – former Archbishop of Melbourne
 George Pell  – cardinal of the Roman Catholic Church (1983–present), Prefect of the Secretariat for the Economy of the Holy See (2014-2019)

Sport
 Tony Benson – Australian athlete 1972 Munich Olympics
 Brett Bewley – Australian rules football player for Fremantle Dockers
 Brian Brown – Australian rules football player for Essendon Bombers
 Mitch Brown – Australian rules football player for West Coast Eagles
 Nathan Brown – Australian rules football player for Collingwood Magpies
 Brad Crouch – Australian rules football player for Adelaide Crows
 Matt Crouch – Australian rules football player for Adelaide Crows
 Tom Downie – Australian rules football player for GWS Giants
 Liam Duggan – Australian rules football player for West Coast Eagles
 Anthony Edwards – Australian rower, five-time Olympian
 Danny Frawley – Australian rules football player for St Kilda Saints
 Brian Gleeson – Australian rules football player for St Kilda Saints, Brownlow medallist
 Martin Gleeson – Australian rules football player for Essendon Bombers
 Shaun Grigg – Australian rules football player for Carlton Blues
 Jack Hill – Australian and Victorian cricket player
 Jacob Hopper – Australian rules football player for GWS Giants
 John James – Australian rules football player for Carlton Blues, Brownlow medallist
 Alex McDonald – Australian rules football player for Hawthorn Hawks and Collingwood Magpies
 Anthony McDonald – Australian rules football player for Melbourne Demons
 James McDonald – Australian rules football player for Melbourne Demons
 Oscar McDonald – Australian rules football player for Melbourne Demons
 Tom McDonald – Australian rules football player for Melbourne Demons
 Michael McGuane – Australian rules football player for Carlton Blues and Collingwood Magpies
 James Marburg – Australian rower, silver medalist at 2008 Beijing Olympics, fifth at 2012 London Olympics
 Steve Moneghetti – four-time Olympic marathon runner
 Jake Neade – Australian rules football player for Port Adelaide
 Leo O'Brien – Australian test cricket player
 Nick O'Brien – Australian rules football player for Essendon Bombers
 Jesse Palmer (Australian footballer) – Australian rules football player for Port Adelaide
 Drew Petrie – Australian rules football player for North Melbourne Kangaroos
 Michael Pickering – Australian rules football player for North Melbourne Kangaroos
 Paul Reedy – Australian rower, silver medalist at 1984 Los Angeles Olympics
 Barry Richardson – Australian rules football player for Richmond Tigers
 Matthew Rosa – Australian rules football player for West Coast Eagles
 Christian Ryan – Australian rower, silver medalist at 2000 Sydney Olympics
 Harry Sharp – Australian rules football player for Brisbane Lions
 Nathan Sobey - basketballer
 Nick Suban – Australian rules football player for Fremantle Dockers
 Bryan Thomas – Olympic sprint kayaker 1988
 Brian Vear – Australian rower, 1960 Rome Olympics and 1964 Tokyo Olympics
 Peter Walsh – Australian rules football player for Port Adelaide
 Tom Williamson – Australian rules football player for Carlton Blues
 Dallas Willsmore – Australian rules football player for Hawthorn Hawks
 Clinton Young – Australian rules football player for Hawthorn Hawks
 Will Young – Australian rules football player for Adelaide Crows
 Josh Gibcus- Australian rules football player for Richmond Tigers
 Daniel Rioli- Australian rules football player for Richmond Tigers
 Aaron Cadman -AFL Footballer for GWS
 Sam Butler-AFL Footballer 
 Dan Butler-AFL Footballer
 Mario Bortolotto- Carlton Footballer

See also 

 Catholic education in Australia
 List of schools in Ballarat
 List of schools in Victoria, Australia
 List of boarding schools

References

External links
 

Congregation of Christian Brothers secondary schools in Australia
Associated Catholic Colleges
Roman Catholic Diocese of Ballarat
Educational institutions established in 1893
Boarding schools in Victoria (Australia)
Boys' schools in Victoria (Australia)
1893 establishments in Australia
Ballarat Associated Schools
Schools in Ballarat
Catholic Church sexual abuse scandals in Australia
Catholic schools in Victoria (Australia)